Welltower Inc. is a real estate investment trust that invests in healthcare infrastructure. Based on its 2021 revenue, it ranked 630th on the 2021 Fortune 1000, and is a component of the S&P 500. As of early 2021, the firm had an enterprise value of $50 billion and is the world's largest healthcare real estate investment trust.

History
The company was founded in 1970 by Bruce Thompson and Frederic D. Wolfe as the first healthcare focused real estate investment trust (REIT). The REIT structure is a tax status that allows commercial real estate income to pass through to shareholders without being taxed at the corporate level. The company was led by George Chapman from 1996 to 2014, when he retired and was succeeded by Thomas DeRosa. DeRosa served on the board for many years before becoming CEO; he has been associated with the company since 1992. DeRosa previously worked as vice chairman and chief financial officer of the Rouse Company before it merged with General Growth Properties.

Originally named Health Care Fund, the company changed its name to Health Care REIT in 1985. Health Care REIT became Welltower in September 2015. The company says its latest name change reflects shifts in its business model and distinguishes it from others in its category.

The 2008 passage of the REIT Investment Diversification and Empowerment Act (RIDEA) prompted a significant change in the company's business model. Prior to RIDEA, healthcare REITs were required to hold their assets under  triple-net leases that limited their role primarily to collecting rent. RIDEA allowed healthcare REITs to participate in the actual net operating income of their properties subject to certain requirements such as using a third-party management firm. As of 2015, the company held 35% of its portfolio in RIDEA-structured investments and 27% in properties under triple-net leases.

Welltower stock used to trade under the symbol "HCN" on the New York Stock Exchange. The company changed its ticker symbol to "WELL" on February 28, 2018. Welltower relies heavily on institutional funds to provide capital through public debt and equity markets. As of early 2021, Welltower had a market capitalization of $30 billion. This is up from $150 million in 1992.

Welltower is based in Toledo, Ohio where it maintains a 160-acre campus. As of 2015, it had almost 500 employees. About 200 of them work at its headquarters in Toledo. Welltower also has offices in Dallas, Texas; Santa Monica, California; New York City; London; and Toronto. Welltower has about 1,400 properties in the United States, Canada, and the United Kingdom. Most of its properties in Canada and the United Kingdom are close to Toronto and London respectively.

Acquisitions and developments
The company's acquisitions since 2011 were part of a broader market trend towards purchases of large property portfolios. During that year, publicly traded REITs and operators did 94 deals with a total transaction value of $24.5 billion. In 2011, HCN acquired nearly all the real estate assets of Genesis HealthCare for $2.4 billion. The transaction included 147 properties including post-acute, skilled nursing, and assisted living facilities in 11 states. Genesis continues to operate the properties.

HCN formed a partnership valued at $890 million with Benchmark Senior Living that was announced in February 2011 and closed in March of the same year. The partnership included 34 private-pay senior housing complexes. In January 2015, the company acquired nine Benchmark Senior Living complexes located in New England for $360 million.

The company invested about $5 billion in 2012; it primarily targeted private-pay senior housing and medical office buildings. This included spending $530 million buying assets from Belmont Village Senior Living and $240 million on a property portfolio from Brookdale Senior Living.

On January 8, 2013, the company acquired nearly all the real estate assets of Sunrise Senior Living in a transaction valued at $4.3 billion. Sunrise owned 125 properties in large urban areas in the United States, Canada, and the United Kingdom, including 120 wholly owned properties and five joint-venture properties. In a related deal, Sunrise's property management business was recapitalized and spun-off to a partnership including Kohlberg Kravis Roberts & Company, affiliates of Beecken Petty O'Keefe & Company, and Coastwood Senior Housing Partners LLC for $130 million. HCN bought out their interests in late 2014 through a joint venture with Canadian senior living operator Revera, with Revera owning a 76% equity interest in the Sunrise Senior Living real estate management and the remainder owned by Welltower.

Welltower first partnered with Revera in May 2013 when it formed a joint venture to share ownership of 47 Revera retirement residences in Canada. The company bought a 75% interest in the approximately CAD$1.35 billion portfolio with Revera owning the remaining 25%. In 2015, the joint venture then acquired Regal Lifestyle Communities for CAD$764 million (CAD$12 per share). Regal held 23 private-pay senior housing properties with 3,600 units. Thirteen of these properties are in Ontario and seven are in Quebec. One property each is located in British Columbia, Saskatchewan, and Newfoundland. The initial cash-on-cash yield of these properties was estimated at 6.1%

In early 2015, the company purchased all of Aspen Healthcare's four London hospitals for £226 million. The hospitals were then leased back to Aspen which continues to operate them. The deal included Holly House Hospital, Highgate Hospital, Parkside Hospital and Cancer Centre London. They were leased back to Aspen for 25-year terms.

In August 2015, Welltower formed a joint venture with the Canada Pension Plan Investment Board (CPPIB) to acquire a combined interest of 50.5% in a portfolio of medical office buildings in Southern California. This portfolio was purchased from G&L Realty, another healthcare real estate investment trust. In February 2016, Welltower announced that it had formed another joint venture with the CPPIB to buy a 97.5% interest in senior housing run by Discovery Senior Living in Florida for $555 million. The remaining 2.5% equity was retained by Discovery which operates all six properties. These properties are known as "Aston Gardens." Aston Gardens includes 1,930 units and provides a combination of independent living, assisted living, and memory care.

Welltower announced an agreement to buy 19 properties from Vintage Senior Living for $1.15 billion in August 2016 and closed in September of the same year. The properties sold include facilities for independent living, assisted living, and memory care mostly located in the Los Angeles and San Francisco areas. Before this transaction Welltower owned 114 healthcare properties in California. After closing it will become the largest owner of senior housing in the state. Welltower said it planned to transfer management of the properties to its partner property management firms. Eleven properties were to be assigned to Senior Resource Group, seven to Sunrise Senior Living, one to Silverado.

As of 2016, Welltower plans to construct a high-end facility in Manhattan that provides assisted living and memory care services. The facility will be wired for telemedicine and the ground floor will have retail space. The second floor will be dedicated to a large community area with floor-to-ceiling windows. Upper floors will be devoted to residences and community areas including outdoor living spaces and terraced gardens. The company partnered with luxury real-estate developer Hines to buy a two-parcel site at 56th Street and Lexington Avenue where they plan to build a 15-story tower designed by SLCE Architects. The site and existing buildings cost about $115 million. Wells Fargo provided a major part of the financing for the deal. There are few senior living communities on Manhattan, which has fewer than 75 beds that are fully licensed by the New York State Department of Health to provide assisted living and memory care services. Welltower's move into Manhattan is part of its strategy to invest in markets with high barriers to entry.

In April 2018, Welltower and ProMedica announced the acquisition of Quality Care Properties and HCR ManorCare for $4.4 billion.

In February 2020, Related announced that it would partner with Welltower and Atria to develop a 44-story mixed-use tower in Hudson Yards.

Foundation
In 2016, the company started the Welltower Foundation with the mission of "promoting wellness, encouraging a high quality of life for aging populations and supporting other groups and innovations that do the same." Erin Ibele is the foundation's first president. The foundation's first gift was a $250,000 grant to the Alzheimer's Association in support of the group's annual Brain Ball. The Brain Ball is a national event designed to improve awareness of Alzheimer's and its effects and raise money for research and patient services.

References

External links

Companies listed on the New York Stock Exchange
Housing for the elderly in the United States
Companies based in Toledo, Ohio
Medical and health organizations based in Ohio
Real estate investment trusts of the United States